The following highways are numbered 31B:

India
  National Highway 31B (India)

United States
 Nebraska Spur 31B
 New York State Route 31B (former)
 Oklahoma State Highway 31B